Sir Henry Widdrington (died 1623) was an English politician who sat in the House of Commons from 1604 to 1622.

Widdrington was the son of Edward Widdrington. He succeeded to the estates of his father in 1592. He was deputy warden and keeper of Ridsdale under Sir Robert Carey.  He was knighted at Widdrington on 9 April 1603. In 1604, he was elected Member of Parliament for Northumberland. He was High Sheriff of Northumberland in 1606. He was re-elected MP for Northumberland in 1614 and 1621.
 
Widdrington married Mary Curwen, daughter of Sir Nicholas Curwen. His son William was created Baron Widdrington.

After he died in 1623, the Privy Council of Scotland noted that there was now nobody taking care of justice on the borders of Scotland, then known as the "Middle Shires", particularly in Tynedale and Redesdale.

References

Year of birth missing
1623 deaths
English MPs 1604–1611
English MPs 1614
English MPs 1621–1622
High Sheriffs of Northumberland